The Black Cobra can refer to:

 Black Cobra (film series), an Italian film series
 The Black Cobra (1963 film), a 1963 Austrian film
 Black Cobra (band), a doom band